PolyQ is a biological database of polyglutamine repeats in disease and non-disease associated proteins.

See also
 Trinucleotide repeat disorder

References

External links
 http://pxgrid.med.monash.edu.au/polyq

Biological databases
Post-translational modification